Hard Eight may refer to:

Hard eight, a dice roll in the game of craps wherein both dice land on four
 Hard Eight (film), a 1996 film directed by Paul Thomas Anderson
 Hard Eight (novel), a novel by Janet Evanovich in the Stephanie Plum series